Dr. Kedrick Pickering (born 8 April 1958) is the former Deputy Premier of the Virgin Islands, also known as the British Virgin Islands. He also serves as the territory's Minister of Natural Resources and Labour. He is a member of the House of Assembly of the Virgin Islands and of the National Democratic Party.

Pickering has been described in the British media as "pro-independence".

Background

Pickering was born in Tortola. He grew up in Long Look, East End, Tortola where he still lives today. His father was born in Cuba but was an orphan and was adopted by Virgin Islander Alvin Pickering.

Pickering graduated from the BVI High School (today called the Elmore Stout High School) in 1976. He went on to study at the University of the West Indies, Cave Hill Campus, Barbados. He later earned Bachelor of Medicine and Bachelor of Surgery degrees from the University of the West Indies, Mona Campus, Kingston, Jamaica. He later also earned a Doctor of Medicine degree from the University Hospital of the West Indies, Mona Campus. He is a fellow of the American College of Obstetrics and Gynecology, Washington, D.C.

Pickering was employed as a consultant obstetrician/gynecologist by the territory's government from 1992 until 1999. Before that, he served as a medical officer in the territory from 1986 until 1988. As of 2015, while serving as a Government minister, he still practices gynecology.

Pickering is married to Alice Marie Pickering and is the father of 4 children.

Career in public life
Pickering was first elected to hold public office at the 1999 general election following which he served as a back-bencher. In the 2007 general election, Pickering and his party suffered a defeat at the hands of the Virgin Islands Party, retaining only 2 out of 13 elected seats. In the 2011 general election Pickering returned to office and his National Democratic Party won an overall majority. He was appointed Deputy Premier and Minister of Natural Resources and Labour.

During his political career, Pickering has stood in each election as candidate for the 7th District. He was most recently elected to the House of Assembly at the 2015 general election where he secured 75% of votes in the District. He was re-appointed to serve as Deputy Premier and Minister of Natural Resources and Labour.

He split from the National Democratic Party in 2019, and was voted out of office in the general election later that year.  He has not clarified his future plans.

Electoral history

References

National Democratic Party (British Virgin Islands) politicians
1958 births
Living people